The 2007 United States elections were held on Tuesday, November 6. During this off-year election, the only seats up for election in the United States Congress were special elections held throughout the year. None of these congressional seats changed party hands. There were also several gubernatorial races and state legislative elections, and numerous citizen initiatives, mayoral races in several major cities, and several types of local offices on the ballot.

Federal Elections

There were five special elections to the United States House of Representatives in 2007. Four of them were held after the death of the prior incumbent, while the seat in Massachusetts's 5th congressional district opened up after Marty Meehan resigned to become the Chancellor of the University of Massachusetts Lowell. In each of these special elections, the incumbent party won.

State Elections

Gubernatorial elections

Three states elected governors in 2007, although only two of them voted on November 6, namely Kentucky and Mississippi. Louisiana's election date did not coincide with that of most states; its open primary was held on October 20.

The final results were a net change of zero between the political parties. The Democrats picked up the governorship in Kentucky, but the Republicans picked up the one in Louisiana. The Republicans maintained control of the governorship in Mississippi.

State and territorial legislative elections

Municipal elections
Nationwide, there were cities, counties, school boards, special districts and others that elected members in 2007. Among the high-profile mayoral elections were the following:

 Baltimore: Sheila Dixon (D) defeated Elbert Henderson (R)
 Charlotte: Pat McCrory (R) was re-elected, defeating Beverly M. Earle (D)
 Indianapolis: Greg Ballard (R) defeated incumbent Bart Peterson (D)
 Jacksonville: John Peyton (R) was re-elected, defeating Jackie Brown (D)
 Philadelphia: Michael Nutter (D) defeated Al Taubenberger (R)
 Pittsburgh: Incumbent Luke Ravenstahl (D) was elected to a full term, defeating Mark DeSantis (R) in this special election. Ravenstahl was appointed as interim mayor in 2006 following the death of Bob O'Connor
 San Francisco: Gavin Newsom (D) was re-elected, defeating several other candidates in an instant-runoff voting system.

References

 
2007
November 2007 events in the United States